Arylakh is the name of several rural localities in the Sakha Republic, Russia:
Arylakh, Churapchinsky District, Sakha Republic, a selo in Arylakhsky Rural Okrug of Churapchinsky District
Arylakh, Kobyaysky District, Sakha Republic, a selo in Lyuchcheginsky 1-y Rural Okrug of Kobyaysky District
Arylakh, Mirninsky District, Sakha Republic, a selo in Chuoninsky Rural Okrug of Mirninsky District
Arylakh, Suntarsky District, Sakha Republic, a selo in Tyubyay-Zharkhansky Rural Okrug of Suntarsky District
Arylakh, Ust-Aldansky District, Sakha Republic, a selo in Oltekhsky Rural Okrug of Ust-Aldansky District
Arylakh, Vilyuysky District, Sakha Republic, a selo in Bappagayinsky Rural Okrug of Vilyuysky District

See also
Arylakh (Zharkhan), a selo in Zharkhansky Rural Okrug of Suntarsky District in the Sakha Republic